Księstwo may refer to:
A Polish duchy
Księstwo, Łódź Voivodeship (central Poland)
Księstwo, Masovian Voivodeship (east-central Poland)